Toronto Ribfest is an annual ribfest held in Centennial Park in Etobicoke, Toronto, Ontario, Canada during the Canada Day weekend.

Overview

The Toronto Ribfest is run by the Etobicoke Rotary Club. The festival is not for profit, volunteer run and gives all proceeds to charity. The festival takes place each year around the Canada Day weekend. The festival features rib vendors (which travel from all over North America), live music and beer for sale. The festival also includes many child friendly activities.

History

The Toronto Ribfest was inaugurated in 1999. A drive-thru only event happened in 2020 and 2021 due to the COVID-19 pandemic in Toronto.

References

See also
Ribfest
London Ribfest
Canada's Largest Ribfest
Brantford Ribfest

Food and drink festivals in Canada